Eclipse Jetty is a Java web server and Java Servlet container. While web servers are usually associated with serving documents to people, Jetty is now often used for machine to machine communications, usually within larger software frameworks. Jetty is developed as a free and open source project as part of the Eclipse Foundation.  The web server is used in products such as Apache ActiveMQ, Alfresco, Scalatra, Apache Geronimo, Apache Maven,  Apache Spark, Google App Engine, Eclipse, FUSE, iDempiere, Twitter's Streaming API and Zimbra. Jetty is also the server in open source projects such as Lift, Eucalyptus, OpenNMS, Red5, Hadoop and I2P. Jetty supports the latest Java Servlet API (with JSP support) as well as protocols HTTP/2 and WebSocket.

Overview
Jetty started as an independent open source project in 1995. In 2009 Jetty moved to Eclipse. Jetty provides Web services in an embedded Java application and it is already a component of the Eclipse IDE. It supports AJP, JASPI, JMX, JNDI, OSGi, WebSocket and other Java technologies.

History
Originally developed by software engineer Greg Wilkins, Jetty was originally an HTTP server component of Mort Bay Server. It was originally called IssueTracker (its original application) and then MBServler (Mort Bay Servlet server). Neither of these were much liked, so Jetty was finally picked.

Jetty was started in 1995 and was hosted by MortBay, creating version 1.x and 2.x, until 2000. From 2000 to 2005, Jetty was hosted by sourceforge.net where version 3.x, 4.x, and 5.x were produced. In 2005, the entire Jetty project moved to codehaus.org. As of 2009, the core components of Jetty have been moved to Eclipse.org, and Codehaus.org continued to provide integrations, extensions, and packaging of Jetty versions 7.x and 8.x (not 9.x) In 2016, the main repository of Jetty moved to GitHub, but it is still developed under the Eclipse IP Process.

See also 

 Application server
 List of Java application servers
 Java Platform, Enterprise Edition
 Java Servlet
 JavaServer Pages

References

External links

 Documentation
Jetty Source Code On Github

Free software programmed in Java (programming language)
Free web server software
Web server software programmed in Java
Software using the Apache license
Software using the Eclipse license